Kellybridge Halt railway station was on the Great Northern Railway (Ireland) in the Republic of Ireland.

The Great Northern Railway (Ireland) opened the station on 1 October 1925.

It closed on 14 October 1957.

Routes

References

Disused railway stations in County Louth
Railway stations opened in 1925
Railway stations closed in 1957
1925 establishments in Ireland
1957 disestablishments in Ireland
Railway stations in the Republic of Ireland opened in the 20th century